is a mecha anime series aired in 1982. There were 24 episodes. It is also referred to as "Demon Region Legendary Acrobunch", "'Demon Regions Legend Acrobunch", "'Ruins Legend Acrobunch", "'Acrobanch".

Story
Led by scientist Tatsuya Randou, the Randou family undertakes a journey around the globe in order to search out ancient ruins to uncover the legend of Quetzalcoatl, which unlocks the key to a fabulous treasure. However, tailing the Randou family is Goblin, an evil organisation that covets the legendary treasure for itself. The Randou family has the secret weapon of super robot Acrobunch. It becomes a race around the world of who finds the treasure first.

Concept
Acrobanch was an anime pushed out to capitalize on the archeological adventure craze that was occurring in Hollywood at the time. The art for this series was impressive and the combination sequence of Acrobunch still remains exceptional to this day, setting the benchmark for the rest of the 1980s.  Five separate vehicles combine to form the super robot Acrobunch.  The parts contain 2 motorcycles which form the arm, 2 racecars form the legs, 1 plane form the body.

The series achieved some popularity in France, where it debuted on TV in 1985 and is known by differing titles including L'Empire des Cinq and Askadis - La Légende de l'empire perdu. The French dubbed version changed the names of the lead characters as well as the Acrobunch robot itself (becoming "Thorn-Rock"), and also changed the setting of the series from Japan to Canada.

Discotek Media released Acrobunch'' on standard definition Blu-ray disc for North American audiences on February 23, 2021.

Staff
 Original Work: Yu Yamamoto
 Chief director: Ryō Yasumura
 Series directors: Takao Yotsuji, Takashi Hisaoka
 Screenwriters: Yu Yamamoto, Akira Goto, Haruya Yamazaki, Takeshi Shudo
 Episode directors: Masakazu Yasumura, Takashi Hisaoka, Takao Yotsuji (credited as "Yoshinori Natsuki"), Hiromichi Matano, Kazuhiro Ochi, Hideki Takayama
 Art: Makoto Sato (first half of series), Toshikazu Yamaguchi (second half of series)
 Character Design: Mutsumi Inomata, Shigenori Kageyama
 Music: Masahito Maruyama
 Opening theme ("Yume no Karyudo"): Yu Yamamoto (lyrics), Masayuki Yamamoto (composition/arrangement), Yukio Yamagata (singer)
 Ending theme ("Nagisa ni Hitori"): Yu Yamamoto (lyrics), Masayuki Yamamoto (composition/arrangement), Isao Taira (singer)

Characters

Shigeru Nakahara made his debut as a voice actor with this series, in the role of the youngest Randou child, Jun.

Enoki Films gave the main character the name David Owen. In the French version, Tatsuya Randou is known as Professor Kossig and his five children's names are also changed, to sons Quentin (Ryo), Antoine (Jun) and Mathieu (Hiro) and daughters Ulrich (Reika) and Jill (Miki).

Merchandise
The Acrobunch robot was released as "Acrobunch Kyoui Gatti 5 DX" / "Acrobunch Wonder Combo 5 DX" by Poplar and Royal Condor.  It is built with diecast metals, and the package comes with a number of pieces including motorcycle stops, plane landing gears, airfoils, guns, swords, stickers, missiles, fists.  The US and Taiwan release is especially rare since it was considered 20% smaller, and the label for the toy was "Pentabot" instead of "Acrobunch".  It may have been sold outside Japan as such due to lack of licensing of the anime name title.

Due to the popularity of the anime in France, the Acrobunch robot was also released there under the name "Thorn-Rock," the same name given the robot in the French dub of the anime.

References

External links
 Acrobunch - Enoki Films

1982 anime television series debuts
Adventure anime and manga
Discotek Media
Super robot anime and manga
TMS Entertainment